The Gambia Radio & Television Service is the national broadcaster of the West African state of the Gambia. Gambia Radio & Television Service currently broadcasts in English and native local languages.

History
The history of GRTS stems from the mergership of the older and more established Radio Gambia and the rather recent Television Channel.

Radio Gambia was the first media broadcaster in the Gambia, opened in 1962. Its historical base is Bakau (a town in the Gambia).

In December 1965, GRTS was commissioned by the Gambian government which began test transmissions under the Gambia Telecommunications Company (Gamtel). In 1967, it adopted its own television channel. The Station operates as a public service station based on the tradition of Radio Gambia. The Station's programmes are mostly news, public service announcements, education, entertainment and religious related (Islam and Christianity only, mostly Islam and nothing on Traditional African religion).

Awards
In 2010, the Station was awarded the National Order of the Republic of the Gambia with the rank of "Commander" (CRG).

Notes

External links
Official site

Television stations in the Gambia
Publicly funded broadcasters
1995 establishments in the Gambia
Radio stations established in 1962
Television channels and stations established in 1995
State media